Kapilvastu is a constituency of the Uttar Pradesh Legislative Assembly covering the city of Kapilvastu in the Siddharthnagar district of Uttar Pradesh, India.

Kapilvastu is one of five assembly constituencies in the Domariyaganj Lok Sabha constituency. Since 2008, this assembly constituency is numbered 303 amongst 403 constituencies.

Members of the Legislative Assembly

Election results

2022

2017

Bharatiya Janta Party candidate Shyam Dhani won in last Assembly election of 2017 Uttar Pradesh Legislative Elections defeating Samajwadi Party candidate Vijay Kumar by a margin of 38,154 votes.

16th Vidhan Sabha: 2012 General Elections

References

External links
 

Siddharthnagar district
Assembly constituencies of Uttar Pradesh